Laura, una vida extraordinaria (English: Laura, an Extraordinary Life, is a Colombian telenovela produced by Ángela Pulido Serrano for Caracol Televisión and distributed by Caracol Televisión Internacional. It is based on some moments of the life of the educator, catholic missionary, Laura Montoya. It stars Julieth Restrepo and Linda Lucía Callejas.

Plot 
It is the story late nineteenth century of Laura Montoya, about her beginning in the city of Jericó on her childhood and youth; It was held in a downtown nuns not being accepted by their families; she learned to read and write and received religious instruction to be educator. A few years later she was also accepted at the university, but was despised by discrimination and disreputable about her life as a child. In the end, after many ups and downs, she was recognized as the best exponent catholic missionary founder of the Congregation of the "Misioneras de María Inmaculada y de Santa Catalina de Siena".

Cast 
 Julieth Restrepo as Young Laura Montoya
 Linda Lucía Callejas as Laura Montoya
 Adelaida Buscató as Young Clarissa Montoya
 Marcela Carvajal as Clarissa Montoya
 Pilar Álvarez as Dolores Upegui
 Jose Restrepo as Juan Antonio Montoya
 Elizabeth Minotta as Young Ana Lucía
 Sandra Reyes as Ana Lucía
 Julio Sánchez Coccaro as Padre Ignacio
 Ricardo Mejía  as Young Adolfo Peña
 Juan Carlos Messier as Adolfo Peña
 Biassini Segura as Young Padre Perdomo
 Julio Cesar Herrera as Padre Perdomo
 Jhon Alomia as Jeremias
 Lorena García Escobar as Victoria Peña
 Juliana Velásquez as Marianita
 Nelson Camayo as Carlitos Yaguaré
 Diego Guarnizo as Tomás Carrasquilla / Saturnino

Episodes

Ratings 
 
}}

References 

2015 Colombian television series debuts
2015 telenovelas
Colombian telenovelas
Spanish-language telenovelas
Caracol Televisión telenovelas
2015 Colombian television series endings
Television shows set in Bogotá